Original Traditional is an album by Blue Highway. It earned the group a Grammy Award nomination for Best Bluegrass Album.

Track listing

Personnel
Blue Highway 
 Jason Burleson - banjo
 Gaven Largent - resonator guitar
 Shawn Lane - fiddle, mandolin
 Tim Stafford - guitar
 Wayne Taylor - guitar

Guest
 Chad Lane - vocals on "Top of the Ridge

Production
 Jim Price - engineer
 Bobby Starnes - assistant engineer
 Scott Vestal - mixing
 Paul Blakemore - mastering

References

2016 albums
Bluegrass albums